The Garrett County Courthouse is a historic county courthouse located at Oakland, Garrett County, Maryland, United States. It is a three-story, 1907–1908 neo-classical Renaissance Revival masonry structure in the form of a Latin Cross with a central rotunda and dome. The Courthouse was designed by James Riely Gordon (1863–1937), a New York architect who specialized in designing government buildings.

The Garrett County Courthouse was listed on the National Register of Historic Places in 1975.

References

External links

, including photo from 1974, at Maryland Historical Trust

Courthouses on the National Register of Historic Places in Maryland
Neoclassical architecture in Maryland
Government buildings completed in 1907
County courthouses in Maryland
Buildings and structures in Garrett County, Maryland
James Riely Gordon buildings
Oakland, Maryland
Individually listed contributing properties to historic districts on the National Register in Maryland
National Register of Historic Places in Garrett County, Maryland
Historic district contributing properties in Maryland
1907 establishments in Maryland